Mischa Berlinski (born 1973 in New York, United States) is an American author.  His first novel, Fieldwork, was a finalist for the 2007 National Book Award.  In 2008 Berlinski won a $50,000 Whiting Award, given to writers showing early promise in their careers.

Life
Berlinski is the son of author and academic David Berlinski and cellist Toby Saks, the grandson of composer and musicologist Herman Berlinski, and the brother of journalist Claire Berlinski.

Berlinski is a UC Berkeley graduate, and has worked as a journalist in Thailand.

Awards
 2007 National Book Award Fiction Finalist
 2008 Whiting Award
 2013 American Academy of Arts and Letters’ Addison M. Metcalf Award

Works

Books
 Fieldwork, (Farrar, Straus & Giroux) 2007
 Peacekeeping: A Novel, Sarah Crichton Books, 2016

Articles

 (Reprinted online by Epic Magazine)

Reviews 
Fieldwork received widespread attention when renowned author Stephen King's review of it, called "How to Bury a Book," was published in Entertainment Weekly. While King lauds, at length, the novel's complexity, "narrative voice full of humor and sadness," and suspense, he issues a scathing attack on its publisher, Farrar, Straus and Giroux, for poor marketing choices:

King's review resulted in increased sales of Fieldwork.  When Berlinski won the Whiting Award, he attributed it to his "luck" that "Stephen King, the most famous writer in the world, picked up my book because he didn't like the cover."

In 2007, The New York Review of Books published a positive review of Fieldwork from Hilary Mantel:

References

External links
Fieldwork Website
Profile at The Whiting Foundation
"2007 National Book Award Fiction Finalist Interview With Mischa Berlinski"
Port-au-Prince: The Moment by Mischa Berlinski from The New York Review of Books

1973 births
Living people
21st-century American novelists
American people of German-Jewish descent
Jewish American novelists
University of California, Berkeley alumni
Journalists from New York City
American male novelists
21st-century American male writers
Novelists from New York (state)
21st-century American non-fiction writers
American male non-fiction writers
21st-century American Jews
Berlinski family